The 1939 Creighton Bluejays football team was an American football team that represented Creighton University as a member of the Missouri Valley Conference (MVC) during the 1939 college football season. In its fifth and final season under head coach Marchmont Schwartz, the team compiled a 4–5 record (2–4 against MVC opponents) and outscored opponents by a total of 164 to 43. The team played its home games at Creighton Stadium in Omaha, Nebraska.

Schedule

References

Creighton
Creighton Bluejays football seasons
Creighton Bluejays football